The Magellanic moorland or Magellanic tundra is an ecoregion on the Patagonian archipelagos south of latitude 48° S. It is characterized by high rainfall with a vegetation of scrubs, bogs and patches of forest in more protected areas. Cushion plants, grass-like plants and bryophytes are common.

At present there are outliers of Magellanic moorland as far north as in the highlands of Cordillera del Piuchén (latitude 42° 22' S) in Chiloé Island. During the Llanquihue glaciation Magellanic moorland extended to the non-glaciated lowlands of Chiloé Island and further north to the lowlands of Chilean lake district (latitude 41° S).

The classification of Magellanic moorland has proven problematic as substrate, low temperatures and exposure to the ocean influences the development of the Magallanic moorland. It thus may qualify either as polar tundra or heathland.

Flora and plant communities

Edmundo Pisano identifies the following plant communities for the Magellanic moorland:
Bogs
Sphagnum bogs
Magellanic sphagnum tundra 
Juncus bogs 
Non-sphagniferous bryophytic tundra 
Non-sphagnum moss bog 
Hepatica bogs
Pluvinar mires 
Hygrophytic mire tundra
Montane pulvinar tundra
Bryophyte and dwarf shrub tundra 
Gramineous mires
Tufty sedge tundra
Subantarctic gramineous mire
Woody synusia tundras 
Tundras with Pilgerodendron uvifera 
Association Pilgerodendretum uviferae
Sub-association Pilgerodendro-Nothofagetum betuloidis
Sub-association Nano-Pilgerodendretum uviferae 
Interior nanophanerophytic tundras   
Interior heath of low to medium elevation
Montane nanophaneritic tundra

Where forests occur they are made up of the following trees Nothofagus betuloides (coigüe de Magallanes), Drimys winteri (canelo), Pseudopanax laetevirens (sauco del diablo), Embothrium coccineum (notro), Maytenus magellanica (maitén), Pilgerodendron uviferum (ciprés de las Guaitecas) and Tepualia stipularis (tepú).

Soils and climate
Soils are usually rich in turf and organic matter and poor in bases. Often they are also water-saturated. Granitoids, schists and ancient volcanic rocks make up the basement on which soils develop. Any previously existing regolith has been eroded by the Quaternary glaciations. It is not rare for bare rock surfaces to be exposed in the interior of islands.

The climate where Magellanic moorland grows can be defined as oceanic, snowy and isothermal with cool and windy summers. In the Köppen climate classification it has a tundra climate ET.

References

Bibliography

Shrublands
Ecology of Patagonia
Temperate broadleaf and mixed forests
Temperate rainforests
Ecoregions of Chile
Andean forests

Ecoregions of South America
Neotropical ecoregions
Magellanic subpolar forests